Mautodontha ceuthma is a species of small air-breathing land snails, terrestrial pulmonate gastropod mollusks in the family Charopidae. This species is endemic to French Polynesia.

References

Fauna of French Polynesia
Mautodontha
Gastropods described in 1976
Taxonomy articles created by Polbot